Echinocactus platyacanthus, also known as the giant barrel cactus, golden barrel cactus, giant viznaga, or biznaga de dulce, is a species of cactus (family Cactaceae). It is native to central Mexico in the Chihuahuan Desert. This species is the largest of the barrel cacti. In Mexico the hairs are often used for weaving; the acitrón, a traditional Mexican candy, is produced by boiling the pith.

Description
Photographs exist of specimens almost four feet (almost 1.2 m) in thickness. What is probably the largest individual living today is the one called "Goliat"  at the "Area natural de Daxpe" in the municipio de Cadereyta, Querétaro State, Mexico, which is 9' 8"  (2.95 meters) in height, at least three feet (0.9 meter) thick and weighs about three metric tons (6,600 pounds). Another at Ixmiquilpan, Mexico has a measured diameter of 3 ft 11 in (120 cm) and is 7 ft 10 in (2.4 meters) high. Their stems are a gray-ish blue color and the straight, rigid spines are black. The apex of the cactus is flat and covered with a yellow felt-like substance. They are heavily ribbed and have large areoles.

Gallery

References

External links

platyacanthus
Cacti of Mexico
Endemic flora of Mexico
Flora of the Chihuahuan Desert
Flora of Central Mexico
Near threatened biota of Mexico
Plants described in 1827